Upton was a hamlet in the southwest of today's Bexleyheath in the London Borough of Bexley, in the historic county of Kent.  

Originally, it was on fertile, south- and west-facing slopes, below the main heathland/pasture of the parish of Bexley. As the town known as Bexleyheath arose during the late 19th century and in early half of the next century, Upton became absorbed into it.

In 1860, Red House, the elegant brick and tile home designed by Philip Webb for William Morris, was built on the heath in Upton. Red House is now preserved by the National Trust.

From 1887 to 1978, it was heavily associated with a hospital on Upton Road. The building was still there in 2019.

Gallery

References and footnotes

Districts of the London Borough of Bexley
Areas of London